Oktyabrsky District is an administrative and municipal district (raion), one of the forty-three in Rostov Oblast, Russia. It is located in the western central part of the oblast. Its administrative center is the urban locality (a work settlement) of Kamenolomni. Population: 73,224 (2010 Census);  The population of Kamenolomni accounts for 15.4% of the district's total population.

Notable residents 

Mikhail Biryukov, footballer, born 1987 in Krivyanskaya

See also
Church of Michael the Archangel (Kamenolomni)

References

Notes

Sources

Districts of Rostov Oblast